A nonbuilding structure, also referred to simply as a structure, refers to any body or system of connected parts used to support a load that was not designed for continuous human occupancy. The term is used by architects, structural engineers, and mechanical engineers to distinctly identify built structures that are not buildings.

Examples
 Aerial lift pylon
 Aqueduct
 Avalanche dam
 Barriers
 Blast furnaces
 Boat lifts
 Brick kilns
 Bridges and bridge-like structures (aqueducts, overpasses, trestles, viaducts, etc.)
 Bus stops
 Canal
 Carport
 Chimneys and flue-gas stacks
 Coke ovens
 Communications tower
 Conservatory
 Covered bridges
 Dams
 Dock (maritime)
 Dolphin (structure)
 Electricity grid
 Fountain
 Ferris wheels
 Ferry slip
 Flume
 Fortification
 Fractionating towers
 Gates
 Granary
 Greenhouse
 Hayrack
 Hay barrack
 Headframe
 Infrastructure
 Lattice tower
 Marina
 Memorial
 Monuments
 Oil depot
 Oil platform
 Offshore oil platforms (except for the production and housing facilities)
 Piers
 Pyramid
 Radio masts and towers
 Railroads
 Ramada (shelter)
 Roads
 Roller coasters
 Retaining walls
 Shed
 Silos
 Storage tanks
 Street lights
 Street signs
 Swimming pools
 Structures designed to support, contain or convey liquid or gaseous matter, including
 Cooling towers
 Distillation equipment and structural supports at chemical and petrochemical plants and oil refineries
 Tank farm
 Tomb
 Towers of some types
 Tramways and Aerial tramways
 Transmission towers
 Triumphal arch
 Tunnels
 Underwater habitat
 Water towers
 Wharves
 Windmill

Exceptions

Some structures that are occupied periodically and would otherwise be considered "nonbuilding structures" are categorized as "buildings" for life and fire safety purposes:
 Aviation control towers
 Factories
 Kiosks
 Lighthouses
 Outhouses
 Power stations
 Refineries
 Warehouses
 Cruise ships

See also
 Architectural engineering

References

nonbuilding